Last Love may refer to:

Books
Last Love, a 1946 novel by Dorothy Black
The Last Love, a 1963 novel by Thomas B. Costain

Films
Last Love (1935 film), an Austrian drama film
Last Love (1947 film), an Italian drama film
Last Love (1949 film), a French drama film
Last Love (2007 film), a Japanese film
Last Love (2013 film), directed by Sandra Nettelbeck
Last Love (short film), a 2017 Russian film

Songs
"Last Love", a 1963 song by Stranger Cole
"Last Love" (Vera Lynn song), 1955
"Last Love" (Miliyah Kato song), 2010
"Last Love", a 2013 single by Rihwa